The Great Wass Island Preservation is a  open space reserve located on the coast of Maine,  east of Ellsworth, Maine on Great Wass Island. The reserve, managed by the land conservation non-profit organization The Nature Conservancy, is notable for its subarctic plants and coastal jackpine.

Geography and Recreation
The Great Wass Island Preservation contains heaths and thin acidic soil on coastal bedrock. It is noted for a diverse plant population which includes carnivorous plants, subarctic iris (Iris hookeri), and coastal jackpine (Pinus banksiana). The preserve offers  of trails for hiking. An interpretive brochure is provided at the trailhead kiosk.

History
The Nature Conservancy acquired the land of the preservation in 1978.

References

Nature Conservancy preserves
Nature reserves in Maine